Foucaud is a surname. Notable people with the surname include:

 Julien Foucaud (1847–1904), French botanist
 Thierry Foucaud (born 1954), French politician

See also
 Charles de Foucauld (1858–1916), explorer of Morocco, Catholic religious and priest
 Foucault (disambiguation)